The 2022 Trofeo Alfredo Binda-Comune di Cittiglio was an Italian road cycling one-day race that took place on 20 March 2022. It was the 46th edition of Trofeo Alfredo Binda and the 3rd event of the 2022 UCI Women's World Tour. The race starts in Cocquio-Trevisago and finishes in Cittiglio, on the outskirts of Lago Maggiore in Northwest Italy. The race was won by the world champion Elisa Balsamo in a sprint finish.

Teams
24 teams are set to compete in the race. The Human Powered Health and Uno-X Pro Cycling WorldTeams will skip this race.

UCI Women's WorldTeams

 
 
 
 
 
 
 
 
 
 
 
 

UCI Women's Continental Teams

 
 
 
 Cofidis
 
 
 
 
 
 
 Team Mendelspeck

Result

See also
2022 in women's road cycling

References

External links

2022 in Italian sport
2022
2022 UCI Women's World Tour
Trofeo Alfredo Binda-Comune di Cittiglio